Sang is a rare Korean family name, a single-syllable Korean unisex given name, and an element in many two-syllable Korean given names. Its meaning differs based on the hanja used to write it.

Family name
As a family name, Sang may be written with only one hanja, meaning "yet" or "still". The 2000 South Korean Census found 2,298 people and 702 households with this family name. All but five of those listed a single bon-gwan (origin of a clan lineage, not necessarily the actual residence of clan members): Mokcheon (today Mokcheon-eup ), Dongnam District, Cheonan, South Chungcheong Province. One person listed a different bon-gwan, while four others had their bon-gwan listed as unknown. They claim descent from Sang Guk-jin, an official of the early Goryeo period who was born in Mokcheon and rose to the post of  there.

Given name

Hanja and meaning
There are 35 hanja with the reading "sang" on the South Korean government's official list of hanja which may be registered for use in given names; they are.

: 'above'
: 'yet", "still'
: 'always'
: 'to reward'
: 'business'
: 'mutually'
: 'frost'
: 'think'
: 'wound'
: 'to lose'
: 'to taste'
: 'skirt'
: 'detailed'
: 'auspicious'
: 'elephant'
: 'shape'
: 'bench'
: 'mulberry tree'
: 'shape'
: 'to pay a debt'
: 'school'
: name of a river (the Xiang River in Guangxi, China)
: 'box'
: 'to fly'
: 'refreshing'
: 'plateau'
: 'widow'
: 'mountain pass'
: 'servant's quarters'
: 'oak tree'
: 'cup'
: 'oak tree'
: 'bench'
: 'bright disposition'
: 'to flow violently'

People
People with the single-syllable Korean given name Sang include:
Yi Sang (1910–1937), birth name Kim Haikyung, Korean writer of the Japanese colonial period
Ku Sang (1919–2004), South Korean poet
Chang Sang (born 1939), South Korean politician, country's first female prime minister

As name element
Two names beginning with this syllable were popular names for newborn South Korean boys in the mid-20th century: Sang-chul (10th place in 1950) and Sang-hoon (9th place in 1960 and 1970). Names containing this syllable include:

Eun-sang
Jun-sang
Sang-chul
Sang-eun
Sang-hoon
Sang-hyun
Sang-jun
Sang-mi
Sang-won
Sang-woo
Sang-wook

See also
List of Korean family names
List of Korean given names

References

Korean-language surnames
Korean unisex given names